Ningxiang is a county-level city and the 2nd most populous county-level division in the Province of Hunan, China; it is under the administration of the prefecture-level city of Changsha. The city is bordered to the north by Heshan District of Yiyang and Taojiang County, to the west by Anhua County and Lianyuan City, to the south by Louxing District of Loudi, Xiangxiang City, Shaoshan City and Yuhu District of Xiangtan, to the east by Yuelu and Wangcheng Districts. The city has 4 subdistricts, 21 towns and 4 townships under its jurisdiction, its administrative centre is at Yutan Subdistrict.

The most famous historic resident was Liu Shaoqi, who lived in Ningxiang from 1898 until 1920, before he went to Beijing as President.

The city is famous for its tourism as the home of attractions like He Shuheng's Former Residence, Xie Juezai's Former Residence, Liu Shaoqi's Former Residence, Baiyun Temple, Miyin Temple, and Puji Temple.

Archeology
Ningxiang was a site of spectacular Shang archaeological finds

In 2004, a Chinese team excavated ruins from the Western Zhou period (11th century-771BC) at Tanheli. The findings were of a city site that included two large yellow earth artificial building sites and two even larger sites that may have been palace dwellings. Remnants of moats were found both inside and outside the city. In the highlands outside the city were excavated seven small tombs for nobles and lords which contained many bronze culture implements as well as those made of jade. The site was listed in Beijing as one of the top ten archeological discoveries of 2004.

History
Human habitation in Ningxiang dates back to ancient times. The earliest archaeological remains so far unearthed are the Four-goat Square Zun and Dahe Renmianwen Square Ding from Tanheli site at Huangcai Town, dating back to the late Shang dynasty (11th–10th century BC).
In the Warring States (475–221 BC) period, Ningxiang was under the jurisdiction of Qianzhongjun of Chu State (1115–223 BC).

After conquering all the states, Emperor Qin Shi Huang implemented the system of prefectures and counties in 221 BC. Ningxiang belonged to Changshajun.

In the Han dynasty (202 BC–220 AD), Ningxiang was under the jurisdiction of Yiyang County and Xiangyin County.

In the Three Kingdoms period (220–280), king of Wu State (222–280), Sun Quan, seized Jingzhou, Ningxiang came under the jurisdiction of Wu State. In 257, the imperial court set up the Xinkang County, and Changqiao (now Hengshi) became the seat of the county administration.

In the Tang dynasty (618–907), the imperial court established a granary in today's Laoliangcang Town. Buddhism was introduced into Ningxiang some time in the 9th century. According to Wu Deng Hui Yuan, in 806, the prime minister Pei Xiu submitted a written statement to the imperial court, which was approved to found the Miyin Temple at the foot of Mount Wei. His son, Pei Wende, a former zhuangyuan, received ordination as a monk with the Dharma name of "Jinshan Fahai". The character of Fahai in the Legend of the White Snake is based on him. Liu Dui, the first jinshi in the history of Ningxiang, also known as "jinshi of Ningxiang for the first time".

In the 2nd year of Tiancheng Period (927) of the Later Tang dynasty (923–936), the King of Chu, Ma Yin, founded the Chu Kingdom (927–963). He set up three counties of Yiyang, Changsha and Xiangxiang in Ningxiang area. Xinkangyi was renamed Yutan Town, when it has a pond like a jade.

In the Song dynasty (960–1279), Yi Fu, the first Ningxiang people won the title of "wenzhuangyuan", and he was appointed as the title of "Founding Man of Ningxiang".

In the early Yuan dynasty (1271–1368), Ningxiang came under the jurisdiction of Tanzhou, and then under the jurisdiction of Tanzhoulu.

In June of the 5th year of Hongwu Period (1372) of the Ming dynasty (1368–1644), Tanzhou was renamed as Changshafu, and Ningxiang under its jurisdiction.

In the 4th year of Shunzhi Period (1647) of the Qing dynasty (1644–1911), Gao Shijun led his army to conquer Changsha and Ningxiang was incorporated into the territory of Qing Empire. Changshafu was set up, affiliated to Hu-Guang province and possessed 12 counties, including Ningxiang. In the late Qing dynasty, Zhu Yidian joined the Taiping Army in Zhushi Bridge with his troops, he had fought many battles in Jiangxi, Zhejiang and Fujian, and was awarded the title of "Xiaotian Yiwang" and "Fuchao Tianjun".

In 1922, Ningxiang belonged to Hunan province.

On June 18, 1944, Changsha was captured by the Imperial Japanese Army. The Imperial Japanese Army attacked Ningxiang from Yiyang and Qiaokou, a battalion of 58th Division of 74th Army of the Chinese Nationalist Army held the Wei River bank, they blazed away at the enemy until the supplies were exhausted. They fought hand to hand with the enemy, but they were practically wiped out in the battle, known as the "Battle of Hill of Du Family".

On February 9, 1949, Jiang Yaxun and Li Shiqiu led the Huang-Tang Uprising in both towns of Huangcai and Tangshi. They published the Letter to the People of Central Hunan and the Open Letter to Cheng Qian. On August 4, Ningxiang was liberated by the 436th Regiment of 146th Division of 49th Army of the PLA 4th Field Army, which was led by Cui Rongtai and Wang Qiao. On August 27, the People's Government of Ningxiang County was set up.

After the establishment of the Communist State in October 1949, Ningxiang was under the jurisdiction of Yiyang Zhuanqu. From 1952 to November 1962, Ningxiang belonged to Xiangtan Zhuanqu, and then belonged to Yiyang Zhuanqu till June 1983, while the county was under jurisdiction of Changsha.

In 2017, Ningxiang was upgraded to a county-level city.

Administrative division 
According to the result on adjustment of township-level administrative divisions of Ningxiang county on November 19, 2015, Fengmuqiao township and Xieleqiao town merged to Huitang town, Nantianping township merged to Batang town, Zhuliangqiao township merged to Shuangjiangkou town, Ningxiang county has 4 townships, 21 towns and 4 subdistricts under its jurisdiction.

Geography
Ningxiang County is located in the middle of Hunan province. The county is bordered by Wangcheng District, to the east, Xiangtan County, to the Southeast, Shaoshan, Xiangxiang, Lianyuan, and Loudi, to the south, Anhua County, to the west, Taojiang County and Yiyang, to the North.

Climate
Ningxiang County is in the monsoon-influenced humid subtropical climate zone and exhibits four distinct seasons. Spring and fall are warm, while winter is chilly with cold winds.

Rivers
The Wei River flows through Ningxiang County and has seven major tributaries:  Huangjuan River, Duan River, Mei River, Tiechong River, Yutang River, Chu River and Wu River.

The Jin River flows through Ningxiang County to Xiangtan, is one of the largest tributaries of the Xiang River.

Lakes and reservoirs
The Huangcai Reservoir, also known as "Qingyang Lake", is a large reservoir located in the northwestern part of Ningxiang County. It is the largest body of water in Ningxiang County and the largest reservoir in Ningxiang County.

The Tianping Reservoir, also known as "Qingshan Lake", is a large reservoir located in the western part of Ningxiang County. It is the second largest body of water in Ningxiang County and the second largest reservoir in Ningxiang County.

Mountains

The highest natural elevation in Ningxiang County is 1071m at Wazizhai.

Government

The current CPC Party Secretary of Ningxiang is Yu Xinfan and the current Mayor is Fu Xuming. He Yinghui is the Chairmen of Ningxiang People's Congress, which is the equal of Head of Parliament. The Chairmen of CPPCC Ningxiang Committee is Deng Jieping.

Economy
Ningxiang is one of the most developed counties in Hunan, it ranked the 18th in the Top100 of counties and county-level cities of China by comprehensive strength in 2020. It is one of the best developed manufacturing counties and county-level cities in the province, the manufacturing industry is its economic pillar. Ningxiang's economic engines are food and beverage, Advanced equipment manufacturing, new materials, modern services industry, machinery manufacture and clothing. For example, of 2015, the gross domestic product of Ningxiang County was CN￥100.22 billion (US$16.09 billion), Of this total, the value added of the manufacturing industry was CN￥61.31 billion (US$9.84 billion), shares 61.18 percentage of its GDP.

Ningxiang County has a variety of industries, such as the Wangbuliao Clothing, Sundance Clothing, Tsingtao Brewery, and Sany. The county's manufacturing products include paper, technological equipment, automobiles, food, clothing and other goods. The service sector of the county's economy includes things like banking, health care, construction, communications, education, tourism and government. Tourism comprises a large part of Ningxiang County's economy, with 20 million visitors spending ￥2 billion in 2014.

According to preliminary accounting of the statistical authority, the gross domestic product of Ningxiang City in 2017 was 122,445 million yuan (18,135 million US dollars), up by 10.3 percent over the previous year. Of this total, the value added of the primary industry was 12,382 million yuan (1,834 million US dollars), up by 3.9 percent, that of the secondary industry was 80,666 million yuan (11,947 million US dollars), up by 10.6 percent and that of the tertiary industry was 29,397 million yuan (4,354 million US dollars), up by 12.5 percent. The value added of the primary industry accounted for 10.11 percent of the GDP; that of the secondary industry accounted for 65.88 percent; and that of the tertiary industry accounted for 24.01 percent. The per capita GDP in 2017 was 96,118 yuan (14,236 US dollars).

Development zone 
The Ningxiang Economic and Technological Development Zone (NETZ) consists of parts of Chengjiao, Shuangjiangkou and Jinghuapu of Ningxiang County. It was created on 10 January 1998 and upgraded to an ETZ at state level On 11 November 2010. The main industries in the zone consists of Food and Drink, Advanced Material, advanced equipment manufacturing, health product and cosmetics.

Demographics

Population
As of 2012, the National Bureau of Statistics of the People's Republic of China estimates the county's population now to be 1,368,117.

Language
Mandarin is the official language.

Religion
The county government supports all religions. As of 2015, the majority of people in Ningxiang are atheists. Of those who are religious, most follow Chinese folk religion. Only 3% of Ningxiang people are Buddhists, 1% are Taoists, and 1% are Roman Catholics or Protestants.

Education

Ningxiang County has its own laws regulating education. The county government require young people to attend school. The age limits vary: six to fifteen. Every child in the county is guaranteed up to 9 years of education. Filling classroom from kindergarten to the twelfth grade, they attend classes for an average of five hours a day, five days a week, until the beginning of the following summer.

Ningxiang County's students pass through several levels of schooling, and thus, several curricula, on their way to a high school diploma. They attend:

 Elementary School. The Elementary School usually means grade 1 through 6. And grades 7, 8, and 9 make up what is called an "Elementary Middle School". Ningxiang County has more than 200 public schools and more than 100 public middle schools. Almost every elementary school provides instruction in these subjects: Chinese language (it includes reading, grammar, composition, and literature), English language, mathematics, science, history, geography, biology, ideological and political, computer, art, music, and physical education.
 Secondary School. The Secondary School generally means grade 10-12. These grades are popularly called "High School". Secondary schools offer these subjects: Chinese language, English language, mathematics, physics, chemistry, biology, history, geography, political,  computer, and physical education. Ningxiang County has 16 public high schools.

Transportation

Rail
The Luoyang–Zhanjiang Railway, more commonly known as "Luzan Railway", from Luoyang City, Henan Province to Zhanjiang City, Guangdong Province, through Ningxiang.

The Shanghai–Kunming high-speed railway passes through the southeastern Ningxiang's Datunying Town and Daolin Town.

The Shimen–Changsha railway passes across the northeastern Ningxiang's Jinzhou Town and Chengjiao Subdistrict.

Expressway
The G5513 Changsha–Zhangjiajie Expressway runs west to east through Chengjiao Subdistrict and Jinzhou Town.

The S71 Yiyang–Loudi–Hengyang Expressway, also popularly known as "Yilouheng Expressway", runs north-south through western Ningxiang, passing through the towns of Qingshanqiao, Liushahe, Laoliangcang, Hengshi, Yujia'ao to Yiyang connects to S50 Changsha–Shaoshan–Loudi Expressway at Fanjiang Town of Xiangxiang.

The S50 Changsha–Shaoshan–Loudi Expressway, locally known as "Changshaolou Expressway", travels through the southern Ningxiang, leading eastwards to Yuelu District of Changsha and westwards to Louxing District of Loudi.

The Shaoshan Expressway passes north through Datunying Town and connects to S50 Changsha–Shaoshan–Loudi Expressway at Huaminglou Town.

National Highway
The National Highway G319, commonly abbreviated as "G319", is a northwest-southeast highway passing through the city’s downtown, commercial, and industrial districts in the eastern part of the city.

Provincial Highway
The Provincial Highway S206 passes through the northern Ningxiang's Jinghuapu Township and Meitanba Town.

The Provincial Highway S208 runs north to south through the eastern Ningxiang's Lijingpu Subdistrict, Xiaduopu Town, Batang Town, Donghutang Town, and Datunying Town.

The Provincial Highway S209 is a major northeast-southwest highway that runs through many of towns and subdistricts in Ningxiang, such as Yutan Subdistrict, Baimaqiao Subdistrict, Huilongpu Town, Dachengqiao Town, Shuangfupu Town, Hengshi Town, Laoliangcang Town, Liushahe Town, and Qingshanqiao Town.

The Provincial Highway S311, runs southeast to northwest through southwestern Ningxiang, and is connected to Provincial Highway S209 at Qingshanqiao Town.

Culture
Huaguxi is the most influence local theater.

Tourism
Ningxiang County's most visited Buddhist temple is Miyin Temple, which was built in Tang dynasty (618–907) in Weishan Township, the county is also known for Puji Temple and Shangliu Temple in Qingshanqiao Town, and Baiyun Temple in Huilong Mountain.

Huitang Hot Spring is a popular attraction.

Former Residence of Liu Shaoqi, Former Residence of Xie Juezai and Former Residence of He Shuheng are well known tourist spots.

Notable people

Ningxiang County is the birthplace of:

 Gan Siqi - one of only 57 generals bestowed the honour of being a "founding general" of the People's Republic of China.
 He Shuheng -  a proletarian revolutionary in modern China.
 Huang Yali - a pop singer who earned sixth place in the 2006 Super Girl contest.
 Ray Huang - a historian and philosopher best known in his later years for the idea of macro-history.
 Li Zehou - a scholar of philosophy and intellectual history who currently resides in the United States.
 Liu Shaoqi - a former president of the People's Republic of China. His former residence is now a museum.
 Liu Yuan - one of sons of Liu Shaoqi, a general and the political commissar of the People's Liberation Army General Logistics Department.
 Lu Diping -  a military general and politician.
 Lu Li - a gymnast best known for her gold medal on the uneven bars in the 1992 Summer Olympics in Barcelona.
 Qi Xueqi - a famous Anti-Japanese commander of the Kuomintang (KMT).
 Tang Sulan - a writer and politician.
 Tao Zhiyue - a Kuomintang general during the Second Anti-Japanese War.
 Tong Enzheng - an archaeologist, historian, designer, and science fiction author.
 Xiang Zhejun - a jurist and prosecutor at International Military Tribunal for the Far East.
 Xie Juezai - former Deputy Secretary of the Central Commission for Discipline Inspection.
 Xie Fei - son of Xue Juezai, a world-recognized Chinese film director.
 Ye Xiaowen - former director of the State Administration for Religious Affairs
 Zhou Guangzhao - former President of Chinese Academy of Sciences.
 Zhou Shuguang - a blogger and citizen journalist best known for traveling around China to document injustice done to citizens.

Footnotes

External links

Ningxiang website (Chinese)
http://www.changsha.gov.cn/

 
County-level divisions of Changsha